Eulimella perturbata is a species of sea snails, a marine gastropod mollusc in the family Pyramidellidae, the pyrams and their allies.

Distribution
This marine species occurs off Mauretania..

References

 Peñas, A.; Rolán, E.; Swinnen, F. (2014). The superfamily Pyramidelloidea Gray, 1840 (Mollusca, Gastropoda, Heterobranchia) in West Africa, 11. Addenda 3. Iberus. 32(2): 105-206. page(s): 179-181

External links
 To World Register of Marine Species

perturbata
Gastropods described in 2014